Sir Rashbehari Ghosh Mahavidyalaya, also known as Ukhrid College, established in 2010, is an undergraduate general and honours degree college at Ukhrid in Khandaghosh CD Block of Purba Bardhaman district. It offers undergraduate courses in arts. It is affiliated to  University of Burdwan.

History 
Sir Rashbehari Ghosh Mahavidyalaya (SRGM) was set up, keeping in mind the ideals of Rash Behari Ghosh, who was an Indian politician, lawyer, social worker and philanthropist. The college was established through a notification of the Government of West Bengal in 2010 and originally affiliated to the University of Burdwan. People of Ukhrid participated in freedom struggle. After independent Sir Rashbehari Ghosh Mahavidyalaya was an outcome development work started. Initially, Arts stream was introduced in the college at intermediate level.

Campus 
The Sir Rashbehari Ghosh Mahavidyalaya is well connected to other parts of the area through both railways and roadways. The nearest railway station is the Bowaichandi railway station, from the college on the south and the very nearest roadway is the Khandaghosh-Badulia Road, which is well connected to the State Highway 7 (West Bengal).

This institution has rich tradition which is gradually blended with modernity. This college aims to surge ahead with the inhabitants of rural Bengal. The college has a  campus in the heart of the block of Khandaghosh which comprises two storied building. The College Authority has a plan to build a modest library, one Girls' Common Room and one Boys' Common Room cum Students' Union Room and a huge playground in near future.

Shifts
Day: Undergraduate general and honours course classes for Arts.

Departments

Science

Arts and Commerce
B.A. Honours Subjects: 
Bengali
English
History
Political Science
Philosophy
Sanskrit
B.A. General Subjects:
Bengali
English
Education
ENVS
History
Philosophy
Political Science
Sanskrit

Admission
Admission to the first-year undergraduate classes are usually held after the publication of the result of the Higher Secondary Examination under the West Bengal Council of Higher Secondary Education in May/June every year and is based strictly on merit through open counseling procedure.

Accreditation
The college is recognized by the University Grants Commission (UGC).

See also
List of institutions of higher education in West Bengal
Education in India
Education in West Bengal

References

External links
 Sir Rashbehari Ghosh Mahavidyalaya

Colleges affiliated to University of Burdwan
Educational institutions established in 2010
Universities and colleges in Purba Bardhaman district
2010 establishments in West Bengal